A Tiger's Tale is a 1987 American comedy-drama film starring Ann-Margret and C. Thomas Howell, written and directed by Peter Douglas, based on the novel Love and Other Natural Disasters by Allen Hannay III.

Plot
Bubber Drumm is a Houston high school student. Rose Butts is an alcoholic, more than twice his age, and the mother of his girlfriend, Shirley. Bubber and Rose begin an affair after Bubber fixes Shirley up with his pal, Ransom McKnight.

Bubber and Rose carry on their affair under the nose of her daughter until everything comes out in the open at a drive-in movie theater. To get even with Bubber and Rose for "behaving badly", Shirley pricks a hole in Rose's diaphragm. Shirley goes on to live with her father and Bubber moves in with Rose along with his pet tiger. The diaphragm incident results in Rose getting pregnant with Bubber's baby. The couple must decide whether to keep the baby and continue their May/December romance or part ways.

Principal cast

Music
The non-score music is by the Textones (Carla Olson, Phil Seymour, Joe Read, George Callins, Tom Jr Morgan).

Critical reception
Roger Ebert of The Chicago Sun-Times gave the film 2 out of 4 stars although he did like certain aspects of the film:

Janet Maslin of The New York Times:

References

External links 

1987 films
1980s coming-of-age comedy-drama films
1980s sex comedy films
American coming-of-age comedy-drama films
American sex comedy films
Atlantic Entertainment Group films
Films based on American novels
Films based on romance novels
Films scored by Lee Holdridge
Films set in Texas
Films shot in Texas
1980s American films